Rui dos Santos Cordeiro Neves (born 10 March 1965) is a Portuguese former footballer who played in the Primeira Liga for Porto, Espinho, União Madeira and Salgueiros, in the Segunda Divisão de Honra for Aves, Felgueiras and Famalicão, in the regional divisions for a large number of clubs, and in the English Football League Third Division (fourth tier) for Darlington. He made four appearances for Portugal's under-21 team in the 1987 Toulon Tournament.

References

1965 births
Living people
People from Vinhais
Portuguese footballers
Portugal under-21 international footballers
Association football forwards
S.C. Beira-Mar players
Leixões S.C. players
C.D. Estarreja players
FC Porto players
S.C. Espinho players
C.F. União players
C.D. Aves players
S.C. Salgueiros players
F.C. Felgueiras players
F.C. Famalicão players
Darlington F.C. players
F.C. Marco players
SC Vianense players
S.C. Lamego players
Merelinense F.C. players
Anadia F.C. players
Segunda Divisão players
Primeira Liga players
Liga Portugal 2 players
English Football League players
Expatriate footballers in England
Portuguese expatriate sportspeople in England
Sportspeople from Bragança District